Markus Pröll (born 28 August 1979) is a German former professional footballer who played as a goalkeeper. During his career, he played for 1. FC Köln and Eintracht Frankfurt in Germany and Panionios in Greece.

Club career
Pröll was born in Rheinbach. He started his professional career with 1. FC Köln before moving to Frankfurt for the 2003–04 season.

He was elected by the German football magazine kicker as the Bundesliga's best goalkeeper of the first half of the 2006–07 season. Unfortunately he hardly could contend this title as he suffered of many injuries.

References

External links
 Markus Pröll at eintracht-archiv.de 
 

1979 births
Living people
People from Rheinbach
Sportspeople from Cologne (region)
German footballers
Association football goalkeepers
Germany under-21 international footballers
1. FC Köln players
1. FC Köln II players
Eintracht Frankfurt players
Bundesliga players
2. Bundesliga players
Footballers from North Rhine-Westphalia